Benjamin Jeremy Stein (born November 25, 1944) is an American writer, lawyer, actor, comedian, and commentator on political and economic issues. He began his career as a speechwriter for U.S. presidents Richard Nixon and Gerald Ford before entering the entertainment field as an actor, comedian, and game show host. He is best known on screen as the economics teacher in Ferris Bueller's Day Off, as the host of Win Ben Stein's Money, and as Dr. Arthur Neuman in The Mask and Son of the Mask. Stein also co-wrote and starred in the 2008 propaganda film Expelled promoting pseudoscientific intelligent design creationist claims of persecution. Stein is the son of economist and writer Herbert Stein, who worked at the White House under President Nixon. As a character actor he is well known for his droning, monotonous delivery. In comedy, he is known for his deadpan delivery.

Early life
Stein was born in Washington, D.C., the son of Mildred (née Fishman), a homemaker, and Herbert Stein, a writer, economist, and presidential adviser. He is Jewish and grew up in the Woodside Forest neighborhood of Silver Spring, Maryland. Stein graduated from Montgomery Blair High School in 1962 along with classmate journalist Carl Bernstein (class of 1960); actress Goldie Hawn (class of 1963) was one year behind. Actor Sylvester Stallone was a schoolmate at Montgomery Hills Junior High School. He went on to major in economics at Columbia University's Columbia College, where he was a member of Alpha Delta Phi and the Philolexian Society. After graduating with honors from Columbia in 1966, Stein went to Yale Law School, graduating as valedictorian in June 1970.

Career

Legal and academic career

He was first a poverty lawyer in New Haven, Connecticut, and Washington, D.C. before becoming a trial lawyer for the Federal Trade Commission.

Stein's first teaching stint was as an adjunct professor, teaching about the political and social content of mass culture at American University in Washington, D.C. He subsequently taught classes at the University of California, Santa Cruz on political and civil rights under the United States Constitution. At Pepperdine University Stein taught libel law and United States securities law and its ethical aspects. He was a professor of law and economics at Pepperdine University Law School from about 1990 to 1997.

Writing career
Stein writes a regular column in the conservative media outlets The American Spectator and Newsmax. He has also written for numerous publications, including The Wall Street Journal, The New York Times, New York Magazine, Penthouse, Los Angeles Magazine, and Barron's Magazine. He wrote a regular biweekly column for Yahoo! Finance online, with his last article dated August 7, 2009. His bestselling books (with investment advisor Phil DeMuth) include Yes, You Can Retire Comfortably; Can America Survive?; and Yes, You Can Time the Market. In 2009, he published a collection of essays, The Real Stars.

Stein was fired from his position as a Sunday Business columnist at The New York Times in August 2009 owing to a policy prohibiting writers from making product endorsements or advertising. Stein had recently become an advertising spokesman for credit information company Freescore.com and, according to a Times statement, had assumed there would be no conflict provided that he did not discuss credit scoring in general or FreeScore.com itself in his column. However, the publication felt that it would be inappropriate for him to write for them while he was involved in advertising and terminated his contract. Writing in The Spectator, Stein states his belief that the real reasons for his firing were budget cuts at the Times, his criticism of Obama, and pressure from those critical of Expelled, who "bamboozled some of the high pooh-bahs at the Times into thinking there was a conflict of interest".

Political career

Stein began his political career as a speechwriter and lawyer for President Richard Nixon, and later for President Gerald Ford. On May 3, 1976, Time magazine speculated on the possibility of Stein having actually been Deep Throat. Stein responded over the years not only by denying he was Deep Throat but by going further and accusing journalist Bob Woodward of falsifying the famous secret source. In the May 14–21, 1998, edition of the Philadelphia City Paper, Stein is quoted as saying, "Oh, I don't think there was a Deep Throat. That was a fake. I think there were several different sources and some they just made up." After Mark Felt's identity as Deep Throat was revealed, Stein stated that Nixon would have prevented the rise to power of the Khmer Rouge if he had not been forced to resign. For his actions leading to that resignation, Stein said: 

In 2005, Stein said in the American Spectator:Can anyone even remember now what Nixon did that was so terrible? He ended the war in Vietnam, brought home the POWs, ended the war in the Mideast, opened relations with China, started the first nuclear weapons reduction treaty, saved Eretz Israel's life, started the Environmental Protection Agency. Does anyone remember what he did that was bad?

Oh, now I remember. He lied. He was a politician who lied. How remarkable. He lied to protect his subordinates who were covering up a ridiculous burglary that no one to this date has any clue about its purpose. He lied so he could stay in office and keep his agenda of peace going. That was his crime. He was a peacemaker and he wanted to make a world where there was a generation of peace. And he succeeded.

That is his legacy. He was a peacemaker. He was a lying, conniving, covering up peacemaker. He was not a lying, conniving drug addict like JFK, a lying, conniving war starter like LBJ, a lying, conniving seducer like Clinton—a lying, conniving peacemaker.

Career in the media

Stein acted as the monotonous economics teacher in the 1986 movie Ferris Bueller's Day Off. In one scene, he lectures on the Smoot-Hawley Tariff of 1930 and the then-current debate over supply-side economics.

Stein played similarly bland and unemotional characters. He had a recurring role in the TV series The Wonder Years (as science teacher Mr. Cantwell, who would narrate 16mm films in monotone) and played himself in Dave.

He appeared in several television advertisements, such as for Clear Eyes eye drops throughout the 1990s and 2000s, Godfather's Pizza in 1987, a bland science teacher in 1990 for Sprinkled Chips Ahoy! cookies, and in 2013 for small business accounting service firm 1-800Accountant.

From 1997 to 2003, Stein hosted the Comedy Central game show Win Ben Stein's Money along with co-host Jimmy Kimmel (replaced by Nancy Pimental and later by Sal Iacono). True to its name, the money that contestants won on the show was subtracted from the $5,000 pay that Stein earned per episode (in addition to his salary). The show won five Daytime Emmy Awards before ending its run in 2003.

In 1999, Stein also hosted the Comedy Central talk show Turn Ben Stein On. One of the mainstays of the show was Stein's dog, Puppy Wuppy, who had free run of the set. In 2001, Stein appeared on a celebrity episode of The Weakest Link entitled "TV Hosts Edition" alongside other television hosts and was voted off in round 6 despite being that round's Strongest Link. Anne Robinson's quip was that while he "might win Ben's money; you're NOT taking ours!".

Other movies and television shows in which Stein has appeared include Charles in Charge; Seinfeld; Full House; Casper; Casper: A Spirited Beginning; Casper Meets Wendy; The Mask and its sequel, Son of the Mask as well as the television show, The Mask: Animated Series; Earthworm Jim; Star Search; MacGyver; Tales from the Crypt; Richie Rich; Game Show Moments Gone Bananas; Cavuto on Business; The O'Reilly Factor; CBS News Sunday Morning; Planes, Trains and Automobiles; Family Guy; the 1998-2004 version of Hollywood Squares; the Michael Berger-hosted version of Match Game; The Fairly OddParents; Duckman; Married... with Children; The Emperor's New School; My Girl 2; Ghostbusters II; and the intelligent design documentary Expelled: No Intelligence Allowed.

In addition, Stein's voice roles include The Pixies, magical creatures on the animated series The Fairly OddParents; Mr. Purutu on the animated series The Emperor's New School; Professor Wisenstein in Bruno the Kid; the birthday party clown, Mr. Giggles, on The Adventures of Jimmy Neutron: Boy Genius; a bingo caller on Rugrats; and Pip on Animaniacs. Futterman in Freakazoid. Stein also voiced a psychiatrist, again named after himself, in the USA TV series Duckman; he once appeared in the sitcom Married... with Children as a receptionist in the animal afterlife. He also made a cameo appearance in the comic book Young Justice, as Ali Ben Styn. Another cameo appearance was as Rabbi Goldberg in the Family Guy episodes "When You Wish Upon a Weinstein" and "Family Goy". Stein also voiced the character Sam Schmaltz in the 1996 computer adventure game Toonstruck.

Stein has written for the television industry, including outlines for the TV movie Murder in Mississippi and for the lengthy ABC miniseries Amerika. He has also contributed to the creation of the talk show parody series Fernwood 2 Night.

Stein hosted a show on VH1 called America's Most Smartest Model. The show aimed to find the smartest among 14 models through a series of challenges.

On May 14, 2006, during an appearance on the Fox News program Your World with Neil Cavuto, Stein called for a tax increase of 3.5% for wealthy Americans, to be earmarked for soldiers and military initiatives. Stein wrote an editorial for The New York Times critical of those who would rather make money in the world of finance than fight terrorism.

On December 28, 2009, Stein appeared on CNN's Larry King Live with Ron Paul to discuss the attempted bombing of an American plane on Christmas Day 2009. Stein said that Paul's stance that the United States were "occupiers" in Iraq and Afghanistan was antisemitic. The comment started a shouting match between the two men. Two days later, Stein clarified that "if Rep. Paul says he is... not an anti-Semite, I believe him".

Stein's political and economics commentary has appeared on CNBC's The Kudlow Report and CNN.

Commentary in the lead-up to and during the Great Recession
In the period preceding the late-2000s recession, Stein made frequent and vehement claims that the economy was not in recession, and that the issues in the housing market would not affect the broader economy. On March 18, 2007, in a column for the online version of CBS News Sunday Morning, Stein proclaimed at the beginning of the subprime mortgage crisis that the foreclosure problem would "blow over and the people who buy now, in due time, will be glad they did," the economy was "still very strong," and the "smart money" was "now trying to buy—not sell—as much distressed merchandise" in mortgages as possible.

In an August 12, 2007 column in The New York Times, titled "Chicken Little's Brethren, on the Trading Floor", Stein, while acknowledging "I don't know where the bottom is on subprime. I don't know how bad the problems are at Bear (Bear Stearns)" claimed that "subprime losses are wildly out of all proportion to the likely damage to the economy from the subprime problems," and "(t)his economy is extremely strong. Profits are superb. The world economy is exploding with growth. To be sure, terrible problems lurk in the future: a slow-motion dollar crisis, huge Medicare deficits and energy shortages. But for now, the sell-off seems extreme, not to say nutty. Some smart, brave people will make a fortune buying in these days, and then we'll all wonder what the scare was about."

On August 18, 2007, on Fox News Channel's Cavuto on Business, Stein appeared with other financial experts dismissing worries of a coming credit crunch. Thirteen months later, in the global financial crisis in September 2008, global stock markets crashed, Lehman Brothers went bankrupt, Fannie Mae and Freddie Mac were taken over by the US government, AIG was bailed out by the Federal Reserve, Merrill Lynch was sold to Bank of America Corporation, and Morgan Stanley and Goldman Sachs confirmed that they would become traditional bank holding companies.

In a Yahoo! Finance article written on October 17, 2008, Stein explained that his understanding of debt obligations based on real estate loans was less than the "staggeringly large" amount of obligations that were created through trading in derivatives of those, and so why it wasn't as similar to collapse of junk bond empire in early 1990s as he thought it would be: "Where I missed the boat was not realizing how large were the CDS [credit default swaps] based on the junk mortgage bonds."

Business commentator Henry Blodget wrote a piece for Business Insider in January 2008 entitled "Ben Stein is an Idiot", stating that Stein's criticism of those with bearish views and positions on the market was either "delusional" or a deliberate and "shrewd" attempt to create false controversy and drive up web traffic.

Personal life
Stein is married to entertainment lawyer Alexandra Denman. They were married in 1968 and divorced in 1974. They reconciled and in 1977 they were married again. Stein lives with Denman in Beverly Hills and Malibu, California. He also has a summer home in Sandpoint, Idaho, and an apartment in the Watergate complex in Washington, D.C., which he inherited from his parents. In 2014, performance artist Tanya Ma claimed that a financial arrangement between her and Stein had turned inappropriate.  Stein said of the incident that he only expected "hugging and kissing" and that he often gets "mad crushes" on women that "last about ten minutes."

Views and advocacy

Abortion
Stein is a supporter of the criminalization of abortion and was given an anti-abortion award in 2003 by the National Right to Life Educational Trust Fund.

Larry Craig scandal
In 2007, Stein chastised the police and the GOP leadership for their response to the Larry Craig scandal. Stein said that Craig's sexuality should not be an issue: "A party that believes in individual rights should be rallying to his defense, not making him walk the plank."

Tax code
Stein has criticized the United States Internal Revenue Code for being too lenient on the wealthy. He has repeated the observation made by Warren Buffett, one of the richest individuals in the world (who pays mostly capital gains tax), that Buffett pays a lower overall tax rate than his secretaries (who pay income taxes and payroll taxes). Stein has advocated increasing taxation on the wealthy. Stein objected to Obama's proposal in 2010 not to extend tax cuts for the highest earning taxpayers in the midst of the recession, saying that 
There is no known economic theory under which raising my taxes in the midst of a severe recession will help the economy recover. It isn't part of any well known monetarist or Keynesian theory. So if it does no good to raise our taxes, I assume we are being punished. But for what? I don't own slaves. I employ a lot of people full- and part-time and they are all happy with their pay. When charity calls, I almost always write out a check...Maybe when the economy recovers, raising my taxes makes sense, but for now, it's just punishment. 
In 2012, Stein stated that due to the tremendous amount of national debt, he agreed with Obama's proposal to increase taxes on the wealthy and that ultimately everyone's taxes should be raised to avoid defaulting on the debt.

Dominique Strauss-Kahn
When the head of the International Monetary Fund, Dominique Strauss-Kahn, was arrested for sexual assault and attempted rape in 2011, Stein published an editorial in The American Spectator in which he closely scrutinized Strauss-Kahn's accuser and cited Strauss-Kahn's education, wealth, and position as reasons to believe he was unlikely to have committed the crime.

Stein's editorial was criticized by a number of media outlets. Jon Stewart dedicated an entire segment on The Daily Show to his response. All charges against Dominique Strauss-Kahn were formally dismissed by a judge on 23 August 2011.

Ferguson shooting 
In response to the death of Michael Brown, Stein made the following comment:

Evolution 

Stein has denounced the scientific theory of evolution, which he and other intelligent design advocates call "Darwinism", declaring it to be "a painful, bloody chapter in the history of ideologies", "the most compelling argument yet for Imperialism", and the inspiration for the Holocaust. Stein does not say belief in evolution alone leads to genocide, but that scientific materialism is a necessary component. He co-wrote and stars in Expelled: No Intelligence Allowed, a film that aims to persuade viewers that evolution was instrumental to the rise of the eugenics movement, Nazi Germany, and the Holocaust, and portrays advocates of intelligent design as victims of intellectual discrimination by the scientific community, which has rejected intelligent design as creationist pseudoscience. In the trailer for the film, Stein said that his aim was to expose "people out there who want to keep science in a little box where it can’t possibly touch God."

Many critics point out that Stein selectively used and edited quotes by Charles Darwin to make his case in Expelled, also noting that scenes shot at Pepperdine University, in which Stein gives a speech to an auditorium full of students, in fact used a large number of extras, hired to respond favorably to Stein's speech, to fill the room.
The media response to the film has been largely unfavorable. It received an 11% meta-score from Rotten Tomatoes. Multiple reviews, including those of USA Today and Scientific American, have described the film as propaganda.

In a Trinity Broadcasting Network interview with Paul Crouch Jr. regarding the movie, Stein claimed that "[religion] leads you to a very glorious place, and science leads you to killing people".

The Anti-Defamation League issued a statement condemning the film's misuse of the Holocaust and its imagery, "Using the Holocaust in order to tarnish those who promote the theory of evolution is outrageous and trivializes the complex factors that led to the mass extermination of European Jewry".

At the University of Vermont, Stein was invited to receive an honorary degree and be the commencement speaker for the graduating class of 2009. University President Dan Fogel received complaints about Stein's planned appearance, due to Stein's views on evolution. Stein declined his commencement invitation.

At the private, Christian Liberty University 2009 graduation, Stein was awarded an honorary degree and, according to the university, "spoke extensively about his work on Expelled: No Intelligence Allowed".

Foreign policy
Stein is a staunch supporter of Israel. On Larry King Live in 2009, in a heated exchange with then-Congressman Ron Paul, he referred to Paul as anti-semitic for referring to the U.S. as "occupiers" in the Arabian peninsula.

Political endorsements
Stein endorsed John McCain for president in 2008, calling him "an impressive guy". That year, he also stated that he would vote for Ralph Nader. In January 2012, Stein appeared in political advertisements sponsored by Associated Industries of Florida supporting legislation that would create three resort casinos in South Florida. He claimed in late 2014 that President Barack Obama was the most racist president in American history, saying Obama "made everything about race".

In 2016, Stein reprised the famous attendance scene from Ferris Bueller in a campaign ad for Iowa Senator Chuck Grassley. In it, Stein intoned the last name of Grassley's opponent (Patty Judge) to silence, while facts about her missed votes and absences from state board meetings were listed. Stein then calls out "Grassley," which gets a response; Stein mutters, "He's always here."

Stein initially supported Donald Trump in the 2016 U.S. presidential election, but retracted his support in October 2016, writing, "But it's time for Donald Trump to go back to Trump Tower. Time for Mike Pence to move to the top of the ticket." However, Stein went on to vote for Trump.

Aunt Jemima 
In February 2023, Stein released a video on Donald Trump’s Truth Social stating he missed the Aunt Jemima logo with a "large African American woman chef." He added, “But, I prefer when it was a black person, showing their incredible skill at making pancakes."  The video was also shared on Twitter and the story ran on media outlets across the country.  

The original Aunt Jemima logo and brand name was retired in 2021 by PepsiCo and its subsidiary, Quaker Oats. This was due to the connection with the "Mammy" stereotype and racial connotations associated with the character.

Bibliography
Stein's book titles to date (7 fiction, 21 nonfiction) include:

Filmography and television appearances

References

External links

 Ben Stein's official website
 
 
 Ben Stein on Politicking with Larry King

1944 births
Living people
20th-century American comedians
20th-century American male writers
21st-century American comedians
21st-century American male writers
Activists from California
American game show hosts
American male comedians
American male film actors
American male television actors
American male voice actors
American political writers
American anti-abortion activists
The American Spectator people
Speechwriters for presidents of the United States
American University faculty and staff
American Zionists
Anti-black racism in the United States
Columbia College (New York) alumni
Comedians from California
Connecticut lawyers
Daytime Emmy Award for Outstanding Game Show Host winners
Intelligent design advocates
Jewish American attorneys
Jewish American male actors
Jewish American writers
Jewish American comedians
Jewish creationists
Jewish male comedians
Male actors from Beverly Hills, California
Male actors from Washington, D.C.
Neoconservatism
People from Sandpoint, Idaho
People from Silver Spring, Maryland
University of California, Santa Cruz faculty
Lawyers from Washington, D.C.
Writers from California
Writers from Washington, D.C.
Yale Law School alumni
20th-century American non-fiction writers
21st-century American non-fiction writers
American male non-fiction writers
Jewish American male comedians
21st-century American Jews